Kalchas can refer to:

 Calchas, a seer in Greek mythology
 Kalchas, Pakistan, a town in Pakistan
 Kalchas, Rhodope, a village in Greece
 4138 Kalchas, an asteroid